Joe Walters (1935–2017) was a Scottish footballer, who played as a wing half.

Walters was best known for his time at Clyde where he made over 230 appearances, and was part of the 1957–58 Scottish Cup winning team. He then moved to Albion Rovers. His brother, George Walters, played for Clyde and Oldham Athletic.

Walters died on 19 July 2017 at the age of 82.

References

Clyde F.C. players
Albion Rovers F.C. players
2017 deaths
1935 births
Scottish footballers
Scottish Football League players
Association football wing halves
Scottish Football League representative players
Glasgow Perthshire F.C. players
Stenhousemuir F.C. players
Ards F.C. players
Footballers from Glasgow
Place of death missing
Scottish Junior Football Association players